Lou Anna Kimsey Simon is an American academic administrator who served as the 20th president of Michigan State University (MSU). Simon was appointed interim president of the university in 2003, then served as president from 2005 until her resignation in 2018.

Since December 2017, Simon has been John A. Hannah Distinguished Professor in the College of Education at MSU. From 2012 to 2014, Simon served as chair of the executive committee of National Collegiate Athletic Association. She also served as chair of the Board of Directors of the Federal Reserve Bank of Chicago Detroit Branch.

Education
Simon received her Bachelor of Arts in mathematics from Indiana State University in Terre Haute in 1969. She earned a Master of Science in student personnel and counseling from Indiana State University in 1970. In 1974 Simon earned a PhD in higher education from MSU. She is married and lives in East Lansing.

Career

Michigan State University
Simon was hired by MSU to be a faculty member. Over the following years, she served in a sequence of increasingly-senior administrative positions: Assistant Director of the Office of Institutional Research, Assistant Provost for General Academic Administration, Associate Provost, Provost and Vice President for Academic Affairs from 1993-2004, and interim president from April 25, 2003 to September 30, 2003 while then-President M. Peter McPherson served as a representative of President George W. Bush in the reconstruction of Iraq.

On June 8, 2004, the MSU Board of Trustees voted unanimously to appoint Simon as President with a three-year, US $340,000-a-year, contract effective January 1, 2005.

In January 2006, the Board of Trustees increased Simon's salary to US $425,000 although President Simon and her husband Roy Simon donated that year's increase back to the university's capital campaign.

In 2006, Simon decided to add Michigan State University to the list of institutions opposing the passage of the Michigan Civil Rights Initiative, an initiative that ended affirmative action in the state of Michigan.

In 2017, Michigan State's role in the Larry Nassar sexual abuse case led to a large outcry from students, faculty, state legislators, alumni and others, including calls for President Simon to step down. Nassar, a sports physician at MSU from 1997 to 2016, pleaded guilty in a Michigan court to seven charges of sexual assault and faces accusations of sexual assault from more than 150 young girls and women. The Detroit News reported that 14 MSU representatives, including Simon, had been told of sexual misconduct by Nassar across two decades. While the MSU trustees initially voiced support for Simon, public pressure continued to grow until January 24, 2018, when the Michigan House of Representatives approved a resolution calling on the Michigan State University Board of Trustees to fire Simon.

On January 24, 2018, Simon announced her resignation from the presidency. Simon drew further criticism for her resignation letter, which critics felt did not take adequate responsibility for her role, instead characterizing the "blame" directed at her as a result of the case being "politicized."

Simon signed her resignation letter with her title "John A. Hannah Distinguished Professor," a prestigious professorship most were unaware she had been awarded the previous December. The appointment then received criticism from numerous faculty members across the University, due to Simon's career being strictly in administrative roles with virtually no faculty experience, and on the basis of it having been a direct appointment by the trustees bypassing usual academic procedure. Following her resignation, Simon's contract allowed for a 12-month research leave at her full presidential salary, after which she could officially assume her faculty position in the department of educational administration.

On November 20, 2018, Simon was charged with two felonies and two misdemeanor counts for lying to the police about her knowledge of sexual abuse committed by Nassar. MSU interim President John Engler announced that Simon would be taking an immediate leave of absence from the university, without pay. An Eaton County judge dismissed the charges against Simon in 2020.

NCAA 
In August 2012, while president of MSU, Simon began a two-year term as chair of the NCAA's executive committee. Elected to the position one week after the committee's sanctions of Penn State for the university's part in the Jerry Sandusky child sex abuse case, Simon said her goal was to "build trust and confidence back in the system."

References

External links
 Michigan State University biography of Simon (archived from 2017)
 MSU summary of Simon's tenure

Indiana State University alumni
Living people
Michigan State University alumni
Place of birth missing (living people)
Presidents of Michigan State University
Year of birth missing (living people)